Kinami (written:  or ) is a Japanese surname. Notable people with the surname include:

, Japanese actress
, Japanese hurdler
, Japanese baseball player

Japanese-language surnames